Barthélemy-Christophe Fagan, also known under the pen name Fagan de Lugny, (31 March 1702 – 28 April 1755) was an 18th-century French playwright.

Biography 
His father, William Fagan, was a descendant of Irish refugees in France at the time of religious persecution. Here he won a position for his son who had married at the age of 20 a much older widow than him. He took a liking to theater and wrote some thirty plays presented mostly at Théâtre de la foire, Théâtre-Italien and Théâtre-Français. He died of dropsy at age 53, bitter and melancholic by his lack of fortune.

Works 
Theatre
1731: La Fausse Ridicule, opéra comique in 1 act and in prose, with Charles-François Panard, Paris, Théâtre-Français, 12 February
1733: Le Rendez-vous, ou l'Amour supposé, one-act comedy, in verse, Paris, Théâtre-Français, 27 May Text online
1734: La Grondeuse, comedy in 1 act and in prose, Paris, Théâtre-Français, 11 February
1734: La Pupille, comedy in 1 act and in prose, Paris, Théâtre-Français, 5 July
1735: L'Amitié rivale, fice-act comedy in verse, Paris, Théâtre-Français, 16 NovemberText online
1737: Les Originaux, comedy in 1 act and in prose, Paris, Théâtre-Français, 15 July
1737: L'Inquiet, comedy in 1 act and in prose, Paris, Théâtre-Français, 15 July
1737: Les Caractères de Thalie, three-act comedy with a prologue and a divertissement, Paris, Théâtre-Français, 18 July
1737: L'Étourderie, comedy in 1 act and in prose, Paris, Théâtre-Français, 18 July
1737: Les Originaux, comedy in 1 act and in prose, Paris, Théâtre-Français, 18 July
1739: Le Marié sans le savoir, comedy in 1 act and in prose, Paris, Théâtre-Français, December
1740: La Servante justifiée, opéra comique in 1 act and in prose, with Charles-Simon Favart, Paris, Théâtre de l'Opéra-comique, 19 March
1740: La Jalousie imprévue, comedy in 1 act and in prose, Théâtre-Italien de Paris, 16 July
1740: Joconde, comedy in 1 act and in prose, Paris, Théâtre-Français, 5 November
1743: L'Isle des talents, comedy in 1 act and in verse, Théâtre-Italien de Paris, 19 March
1744: L'Heureux Retour, comedy in 1 act and in verse, avec Charles-François Panard, Paris, Théâtre-Français, 6 November
1745: L'Amante travestie, comedy in 1 act and in verse, Paris, Hôtel de Bourgogne, 13 May
1748: La Fermière, three-act comed, in verse, with divertissements and 1 prologue, Théâtre-Italien de Paris, 18 January
1753: Les Almanachs, comedy in 1 act and in prose, Paris, Hôtel de Bourgogne, 7 January
1760: Théâtre de M. Fagan et autres œuvres du même auteur, 4 vol. Text online : 1 - Théâtre-Français (a) 2 - Théâtre-Français (b) 3 - Théâtre-Italien 4 - Théâtre de la foire
Varia
1751: Nouvelles observations au sujet des condamnations prononcées contre les comédiens

Bibliography 
Albert Clerc, Barthélemy-Christophe Fagan, auteur-comique, 1702-1755. Contribution à l'histoire de la comédie en France au XVIIIe siècle, Paris, E. de Boccard, 1933
 Vie de Fagan, in Chefs-d'œuvre de Fagan, Paris, 1789, (p. 1-9)

References

External links 
 Barthélemy-Christophe Fagan on Data.bnf.fr
 Barthélemy-Christophe Fagan on CÉSAR

18th-century French dramatists and playwrights
1702 births
Writers from Paris
1755 deaths